Spy Kids 2: The Island of Lost Dreams is a 2002 American spy action comedy film written, shot, edited and directed by Robert Rodriguez. Rodriguez also produced with Elizabeth Avellán. It stars Antonio Banderas, Carla Gugino, Alexa Vega, Daryl Sabara, Mike Judge, Ricardo Montalbán, Holland Taylor, Christopher McDonald, and Steve Buscemi.

The second installment in the Spy Kids film series, which began with 2001's Spy Kids, the film premiered at the Grauman's Chinese Theatre in Hollywood on July 28, 2002. Dimension Films theatrically released the film on August 7. Upon release, Spy Kids 2 received mostly positive reviews from critics and grossed over $119 million worldwide.

Plot 
The OSS now has a full child spy section, of which Carmen Cortez and Juni Cortez are now Level 2 agents. Although they are the first of the new Spy Kids Division, they face fierce competition from Gary and Gerti Giggles, the children of Donnagon Giggles (the agent whom Carmen and Juni rescued on their first mission). Carmen defends Gary, even after the two outperform them on a mission to rescue the president's daughter Alexandra from an out of control theme park ride, straining her relationship with Juni.

At the OSS awards banquet, Donnagon hacks into the president's teleprompter, and is named director of the OSS instead of Gregorio Cortez. In his acceptance speech, Donnagon announces his two children are being promoted from Level 3 to Level 1. However, the adults are rendered unconcious by a group of "Magna Men", who are seeking the "Transmooker", a highly coveted device owned by the president, which can shut off all electronic devices around the world. The Spy Kids hold them off but the Magna Men manage to steal the Transmooker after Gary causes Juni to drop it in a scuffle. Gary blames Juni for the theft, resulting in him being fired from the OSS.

The next morning Carmen hacks into the database, reinstating Juni as an agent and taking the Ukata assignment, a mission originally meant for Gary and Gerti, to recover the stolen Transmooker. Using some hints from their former arch-nemesis, Alexander Minion, they follow the trail to a mysterious island where no electronics work. Meanwhile, Gary and Gerti are rerouted to the Gobi Desert and while trying to pinpoint their position fall into a pit of camel feces, whereupon they swear revenge.

Carmen and Juni manage to reach the island, but realize that none of their gadgets work. After falling into a volcano, the two meet Romero, a scientist and sole human inhabitant of the island who has been attempting to create genetically miniaturized animals to sell to kids as "miniature zoos". After creating hybrid animals, Romero accidentally poured a growth concoction over them, greatly increasing their size. He also reveals that he created the Transmooker device, as a mean of hiding his island from the outside world, meaning that the stolen Transmooker was a prototype and the real one is on the island somewhere. Romero fears being eaten, so is unwilling to leave his lab, but shows Carmen and Juni the way to the real Transmooker. As both Gregorio and Ingrid are tracking where Juni and Carmen are, they are joined by Ingrid's parents who want to help them find their children.

Carmen is captured by a Spork, a flying pig, and dropped into its nest with Gerti, who tells her that Gary is genuinely evil. Her feelings for Gary change after he and a Slizard he tamed attack Juni and his Spider Monkey. Carmen manages to incapacitate Gary and she and Juni leave to retrieve the Transmooker. Romero, encouraged by Juni, leaves his lab and discovers his creatures are much friendlier than he thought. Carmen and Juni eventually find and recover the Transmooker, eliminating the cloaking around the island, and are surprised when their family joins them. Donnagon then confronts the group, takes the Transmooker and, after a fight with Gregorio tries to destroy the Cortez family with it, but it malfunctions. Gerti reveals she sabotaged it and threatens Donnagon with telling everything to her mother, which he detests. Romero arrives alongside his creatures and destroys the prototype Transmooker as well.

The President and his staff arrive on the island. He and his daughter fire Donnagon; Gary is temporarily disavowed, and Alexandra appoints Gregorio as director of the OSS on her father's behalf. Even though offered a promotion to Level 1, Juni resigns due to the impersonal treatment he had received by the OSS after being framed. As the Cortez family leaves the island, Romero gives Juni a miniature spider-monkey as a gift, and the island's inhabitants bid farewell to the Cortez family.

During the credits, Machete hosts a concert featuring Carmen (with a microphone which helps her sing, and a belt that helps her dance), and Juni (with a guitar that plays itself), but realizes too late that he never put any batteries in the devices before they went onstage. When he breaks this news to Carmen and Juni, this shocks them, realizing they have musical talent. Meanwhile, Dinky Winks, the owner of Troublemakers theme park where Juni rescued Alexandra, paddles to Romero's island to offer a business deal.

Cast 
 Antonio Banderas as Gregorio Cortez, the father of Juni and Carmen who is now called back to the OSS
 Carla Gugino as Ingrid Cortez, the mother of Juni and Carmen
 Alexa Vega as Carmen Cortez, daughter of Gregorio and Ingrid who is now an OSS member of their spy kid division
 Daryl Sabara as Juni Cortez, son of Gregorio and Ingrid and Carmen's brother, also a member of the OSS’s spy kid division 
 Mike Judge as Donnagon Giggles, an OSS agent turned director who was previously rescued by Carmen and Juni, but is now seeking world domination 
 Ricardo Montalbán as Grandfather Valentin Avellan
 Holland Taylor as Grandmother Helga Avellan
 Christopher McDonald as the President of the United States
 Danny Trejo as Isador "Machete" Cortez, gadget inventor and Juni and Carmen's uncle
 Alan Cumming as Fegan Floop, host of Floop's Fooglies
 Tony Shalhoub as Alexander Minion, Floop's assistant
 Matt O'Leary as Gary Giggles, the son of Donnagon Giggles and a rival OSS agent of Juni and Carmen's love interest
 Taylor Momsen as Alexandra, the President's daughter
 Emily Osment as Gerti Giggles, daughter of Donnagon Giggles and a rival OSS agent of Carmen
 Cheech Marin as Felix Gumm, an OSS agent
 Steve Buscemi as Romero

Additionally, Bill Paxton appears as Dinky Winks, a theme park owner.

Production 
Spy Kids 2 was filmed entirely on High Definition digital video. After seeing George Lucas using digital video for Star Wars: Episode II – Attack of the Clones, Rodriguez tested the technology during re shoots for the first Spy Kids film. Rodriguez used the cameras unfiltered.

Filming sites 
 Arenal Lake, Costa Rica
 Austin, Texas, USA
 Big Bend National Park, Texas, USA
 Manuel Antonio, Costa Rica
 San Antonio, Texas, USA
 Six Flags Over Texas, Arlington, Texas, USA

Special effects 
Despite using over twice the amount of special effects than the first film, Rodriguez did not ask the producers for a larger budget; he said that he wanted to be more creative instead of asking the studio for more money for special effects. Rodriguez picked some visual effects companies who were eager and less established, as well as starting up his own Troublemaker Studios, and reemploying Hybrid, who had worked with him on the first film. Gregor Punchatz, the film's lead animator, employed a certain technique to make the movements of the computer generated creatures resemble the stop-motion work of filmmaker Ray Harryhausen, who has a cameo in the film. The scene with the army of live skeletons was shot on a real rock formation, with the two young actors on safety wires, and the computer generated skeletons added later to over three dozen shots.

Music 

The film score was co-written by director Robert Rodriguez and composer John Debney, who had also co-written the score for Spy Kids. The sound is a mix of rock, pop, and indie rock, and includes songs performed by Alan Cumming and Alexa Vega. Unusually, the orchestral score was recorded in the auditorium of a local high school in Austin, Georgetown High School.

All tracks composed by Debney and Rodriguez, and performed by the Texas Philharmonic Orchestra.

 "The Juggler"
 "Spy Ballet"
 "Magna Men"
 "Treehouse"
 "R.A.L.P.H."
 "Floop's Dream" (performed by Alan Cumming)
 "Escape from Dragon-spy"
 "Spy-parents"
 "Island of Lost Dreams"
 "Donnagon's Big Office"/"The Giggles"
 "Mysterious Volcano Island"
 "Romero's Zoo Too"
 "Mothership"/"SpyGrandparents"
 "Magna Racers"
 "Aztec Treasure Room"
 "Skeletons"
 "Creature Battle"
 "Romero's Creatures"/"SpyBeach"
 "SpyDad vs. SpyDad"/"Romero's Gift"
 "Isle of Dreams" (performed by Alexa Vega)

Additional music not on the soundtrack album includes "Oye Como Spy", which is an adaptation of Tito Puente's "Oye Como Va", performed by Los Lobos (the song is on the soundtrack album from the first Spy Kids film).

Release

Home media
The film was released on VHS and DVD in the United States on February 18, 2003. The film is also available to download on iTunes. A Blu-ray re-release was scheduled for August 2, 2011 to coincide with the fourth film.

Reception

Box office
Spy Kids 2: The Island of Lost Dreams opened theatrically on August 7, 2002 in 3,307 venues and earned $16,711,716 in its first weekend, ranking third in the North American box office behind XXX and the second weekend of Signs. The film ended its run on January 12, 2003, having grossed $85,846,429 in the United States and Canada, and $33,876,929 overseas for a worldwide total of $119,723,358.

Critical response
On Rotten Tomatoes, Spy Kids 2: The Island of Lost Dreams has a 75% approval score based on 136 reviews and an average rating of 6.6/10. The site's critical consensus reads: "Though the concept is no longer fresh, Spy Kids 2 is still an agreeable and energetic romp". Metacritic reports a 66 out of 100 rating based on reviews from 29 critics, indicating "generally favorable reviews". Audiences polled by CinemaScore gave the film an average grade of "A-" on an A+ to F scale.

Roger Ebert gave the film 3 out of 4 stars and commented: "With Spy Kids 2: The Island of Lost Dreams, the Spy Kids franchise establishes itself as a durable part of the movie landscape: a James Bond series for kids". Kenneth Turan of the New York Times gave it 4 out of 5 stars said: "The movie is a gaudy, noisy thrill ride -- hyperactive, slightly out of control and full of kinetic, mischievous charm". Lisa Schwarzbaum of Entertainment Weekly wrote: "The antics are a tad more frantic, and the gizmos work overtime, as if ... Robert Rodriguez felt the hot breath of el diablo on his neck. Michael Wilmington of Metro mix Chicago, noting how Rodriguez borrows many elements from television and earlier films, stated that "Rodriguez recycles and refurbishes all these old movie bits with the opportunistic energy of a man looting his old attic toy chest -- but he also puts some personal feeling into the movie. This is a film about families staying together, children asserting themselves and even, to some degree, Latino power".

Other media

Sequels 

It was followed up in 2003 by a third film in the series, Spy Kids 3-D: Game Over, and in 2011 by a fourth film, Spy Kids: All the Time in the World.

Novelization 
Talk Miramax Books released a novelization of the film in June/July 2002. The novel was written by children's book author Kiki Thorpe. The posters and end of the credits even say "Read the Talk/Miramax Books", telling the viewers to read the print retelling.

References

External links 

 
 
 
 

Spy Kids
2002 films
2000s English-language films
2000s action adventure films
2000s spy action films
American children's comedy films
American children's adventure films
American sequel films
American spy action films
American adventure comedy films
Films scored by John Debney
Films scored by Robert Rodriguez
Films directed by Robert Rodriguez
Films produced by Elizabeth Avellán
Films produced by Robert Rodriguez
Films set in the Indian Ocean
Films set on fictional islands
Films shot in Austin, Texas
Films shot in San Antonio
Films shot in Texas
Films using motion capture
Films with screenplays by Robert Rodriguez
2002 soundtrack albums
John Debney soundtracks
Robert Rodriguez albums
Pop soundtracks
Rock soundtracks
Milan Records soundtracks
Miramax films
Dimension Films films
Troublemaker Studios films
2000s spy comedy films
2000s children's comedy films
American spy comedy films
Films shot in Fort Worth, Texas
Comedy film soundtracks
Adventure film soundtracks
2002 comedy films
Films set in 2011
2000s American films